KSST (1230 AM) is a radio station broadcasting an oldies format. Licensed to Sulphur Springs, Texas, United States, the station serves the Northeast Texas area. KSST features programming from Westwood One's Good Time Oldies satellite feed. The KSST facility also holds the Bill Bradford Memorial Broadcasting Museum.

History 
Howard Sterling Smith (1912–1988) and his wife, Charline Elizabeth "Charles" (née Luckey;" 1915–1912), were among the founders, and were the two who selected the call letters, "KSST."

On January 31, 2018, Racy Properties, LLC. requested a construction permit to add an FM translator to relay KSST. If granted and built, the FM station would operate on Channel 267 (101.3) at the maximum ERP of .25 kW, and an elevation of 47 meters, from the KSST tower on East Shannon Rd.

References

External links
KSST 1230 am Facebook
 KSST 1230 AM - official website

SST